Ascidia mentula is a species of solitary tunicate. It is found in the north east Atlantic Ocean, the Mediterranean Sea and Black Sea. It occurs round the coasts of Britain but is seldom seen on the east coast of England or Scotland.

Description

Ascidia mentula has a tough leathery envelope or tunic composed partly of cellulose. The translucent tunic encloses a fluid-filled body with irregular bulges and two inconspicuous siphons. The oral siphon has six to eight, often white-tipped, lobes and is surrounded by up to 100 branchial tentacles. It is usually red, pink or sometimes olive green in colour, and may be grey in deep water. It normally adheres to the substrate by the side opposite the atrial siphon.

Distribution and habitat
Ascidia mentula is native to the north eastern Atlantic Ocean, its range extending from Norway southwards to the Mediterranean Sea and Black Sea. It favours crevices and shady gullies and sometimes adheres to Laminaria holdfasts, stones and shells.

Biology
Ascidia mentula feeds on plankton that it filters from seawater with a mucous net. A small bivalve mollusc (Modiolarca tumida) often lives within the tunic in the body cavity which may also be occupied by a small pea crab (Pinnotheres pinnotheres) and a copepod (Notopterophorus papilio).

Breeding takes place mainly in the summer. Fertilization is external and the tadpole larvae spend a short time in the plankton before settling on the seabed, undergoing metamorphosis and becoming juveniles.

References

Enterogona
Animals described in 1776
Taxa named by Otto Friedrich Müller